Lord Archibald Hamilton of Riccarton and Pardovan (1673 – 5 April 1754) was a British officer of the Royal Navy, and Whig politician who sat in the House of Commons between 1708 and 1747. In the 1690s, he was active in the English Channel pursuing French privateers, including Tyger out of St Malo. He commanded the third-rate  at the Battle of Vigo Bay in October 1702 and then commanded the third-rate  at the Battle of Málaga in August 1704 during the War of the Spanish Succession. He was a controversial Governor of Jamaica.  He then joined the Board of Admiralty, ultimately serving as Senior Naval Lord.

Naval career
Hamilton was baptized on 17 February 1673, the youngest son of William Douglas-Hamilton, Duke of Hamilton and Anne Hamilton, 3rd Duchess of Hamilton, Hamilton studied at Glasgow University and was then sent to study under the Astronomer Royal, John Flamsteed, in London before taking a commission in the Royal Navy aboard the third-rate . Promoted to post-captain on 11 September 1693, he was given command of the fifth-rate  in 1694 and of the fourth-rate  in 1697. In December 1695 he was active in the English Channel pursuing French privateers, including Tyger out of St Malo, an encounter commemorated in a painting by Willem van de Velde the Younger.

Hamilton went on to take command of the third-rate  in 1698, of the third-rate  in 1699 and of the third-rate  in 1702. After that he became captain of the third-rate  in September 1702 and commanded her at the Battle of Vigo Bay in October 1702 during the War of the Spanish Succession. He took command of the third-rate  in 1704 and commanded her at the Battle of Málaga in August 1704. He became captain of the second-rate  in 1706.

Political career

After his naval career, Hamilton saw a place in parliament as a way of finding favour with the Government and hopefully a lucrative office. At the 1708 general election, Hamilton stood for Parliament at Great Marlow, and also at the family seat of Lanarkshire. He was defeated at Marlow, but was returned in a hard-fought contest as Member of parliament (MP) for Lanarkshire. He opposed the Treason Act of 1709, which altered Scottish law in direct contravention of the safeguards included in the Union, but his opposition was short lived as he sought payment for arrears with his pension. He supported the ministry in the vote for the impeachment of Dr Sacheverell and with the support of the Duke of Marlborough was appointed Governor of Jamaica in May 1710.

Hamilton did not stand at the 1710 general election and took up his post in Jamaica in 1711. He played a controversial role in setting up some of the founders of the infamous Bahamanian pirate gang, including Henry Jennings, Francis Fernando, and Leigh Ashworth, for which he was arrested and brought back to England in 1716 by the Royal Navy. He was acquitted by a board of Trade inquiry and released.

Hamilton was returned as MP for Lanarkshire at a by-election on 23 December 1718. He retained his seat at the 1722 British general election , with the help of his 19-year-old nephew, the 5th Duke of Hamilton, a Tory who was actually on the opposing side politically. He was returned again unopposed for Lanarkshire at the 1727 British general election and joined the Board of Admiralty under the Walpole–Townshend ministry in May 1729. He was advanced to First Naval Lord in June 1733 He did not stand at the 1734 British general election, but was returned as MP for Queenborough at a by-election on 22 February 1735. After he failed to support a bill for the Prince of Wales's allowance, he was forced to stand down as First Naval Lord in March 1738. However he was appointed cofferer and surveyor general to the Prince of Wales in 1738. He did not stand at the 1741 British general election, but was returned as MP for Dartmouth at a by election on 27 March 1742. He rejoined to Board, as Senior Naval Lord again, in March 1742 under the Carteret ministry and remained on the Board until the Broad Bottom ministry fell in February 1746. He served as Governor of Greenwich Hospital from 1746 until his death. He kept his post under the Prince of Wales until 1747, when he was turned out for refusing to follow him into opposition. He gratefully accepted a pension of £1,200 a year offered by the Prince.

For much of his life, Hamilton lived at Park Place at Remenham in Berkshire. He died on 5 April 1754.

Family
Hamilton's first wife was Anne Cary (née Lucas) (a daughter of Charles Lucas, 2nd Baron Lucas and mother of Lucius Cary, 6th Viscount Falkland). She died in 1709 and Hamilton then married Lady Anne Hamilton around 1714 (widow of Sir Francis Hamilton, 3rd Baronet Hamilton of Castle Hamilton, Killeshandra, Cavan, Ireland). She died in 1719 and was buried in Westminster Abbey. Later that year, he married Lady Jane Hamilton (a daughter of the 6th Earl of Abercorn). Hamilton and his third wife later had six children:

 Charles (?–1751) Married Mary Dufresne.
 Elizabeth (1720–1800), married Francis Greville, 1st Earl of Warwick (10 October 1719 6 July 1773)
 Frederic (1728–1811), religious minister. Married 11 June 1757 Rachel Daniel.
 Archibald (accidentally drowned, 1744)
 William Hamilton (1730–1803), diplomat. Married 25 January 1758 Catherine Barlow (died 1783). Married 6 September 1795 Emma Hart (died 1815).
 Jane (19 August 1726 – 13 November 1771), married 24 July 1753 Charles Schaw later Charles Cathcart, 9th Lord Cathcart.

References

Sources

External links
 Hamilton biography at Republic of Pirates

|-

|-

|-

1673 births
1754 deaths
British MPs 1708–1710
British MPs 1715–1722
British MPs 1722–1727
British MPs 1727–1734
British MPs 1734–1741
British MPs 1741–1747
Governors of Jamaica
Archibald Hamilton
Members of the Parliament of the United Kingdom for Dartmouth
Members of the Parliament of Great Britain for Scottish constituencies
People from Remenham
Rectors of the University of Glasgow
Younger sons of dukes
Whig (British political party) MPs for English constituencies
Whig (British political party) MPs for Scottish constituencies
People involved in anti-piracy efforts 
Piracy 
Lords of the Admiralty